David Hernández Vallín (born 21 November 1967) is a Mexican politician from the Institutional Revolutionary Party. From 2009 to 2012 he served as Deputy of the LXI Legislature of the Mexican Congress representing Aguascalientes.

References

1967 births
Living people
People from Aguascalientes City
Members of the Chamber of Deputies (Mexico)
Institutional Revolutionary Party politicians
21st-century Mexican politicians